The 1965–66 Boston Celtics season was their 20th in the National Basketball Association (NBA).

On October 29, 1965, Sam Jones set a Celtics single-game scoring record with 51, against the Detroit Pistons. His record would last until Larry Bird's 53 in 1983. The Celtics won their 8th title in a row, which still stands as a record for the most titles in a row. The Celtics defeated the Lakers 4 games to 3.

Offseason

Draft picks

Roster
{| class="toccolours" style="font-size: 95%; width: 100%;"
|-
! colspan="2" style="background-color: #008040;  color: #FFFFFF; text-align: center;" | Boston Celtics 1965–66 roster
|- style="background-color: #FFFFFF; color: #008040;   text-align: center;"
! Players !! Coaches
|- 
| valign="top" |
{| class="sortable" style="background:transparent; margin:0px; width:100%;"
! Pos. !! # !! Nat. !! Name !! Ht. !! Wt. !! From
|-

Regular season

Season standings

Record vs. opponents

Game log
Several of the Celtics games were played in neutral sites, such as Providence, Rhode Island. The games in Providence occurred on November 9 and 26, December 30, February 10 and March 4. Games were also played in Fort Wayne, Indiana (against Detroit on January 27) and in Syracuse, New York (against Philadelphia on February 12) and Memphis, Tennessee (against St. Louis on March 7).

|- align="center" bgcolor="#bbffbb"
| 1 || October 16 || Cincinnati Royals || 102–98 || Boston Garden|| 1–0
|- align="center" bgcolor="#bbffbb"
| 2 || October 20 || Los Angeles Lakers || 100–96 || Boston Garden ||2–0
|- align="center" bgcolor="edbebf"
| 3 || October 23|| @ St. Louis Hawks || 110–120 || St. Louis Arena || 2–1
|- align="center" bgcolor="edbebf"
| 4 || October 28 || @ Cincinnati Royals || 108–113 || Cincinnati || 2–2
|- align="center" bgcolor="edbebf"
| 5 || October 29 || @ Detroit Pistons || 106–108 || Detroit || 2–3
|- align="center" bgcolor="#bbffbb"
| 6 || October 31 || Baltimore Bullets || 105–100 || Boston Garden || 3–3
|-

|- align="center" bgcolor="#bbffbb"
| 7 || November 5 || @ Baltimore Bullets || 129–118 || Baltimore || 4–3
|- align="center" bgcolor="#bbffbb"
| 8 || November 6 || Philadelphia 76ers || 101–91 || Boston Garden || 5–3
|- align="center" bgcolor="#bbffbb"
| 9 || November 9 || Baltimore Bullets || 130–116 || Providence || 6–3
|- align="center" bgcolor="#bbffbb"
| 10 || November 11|| St. Louis Hawks || 87–83 || Boston Garden || 7–3
|- align="center" bgcolor="edbebf"
| 11 || November 12 || @ Philadelphia 76ers || 114–123 || Convention Hall  || 7–4
|- align="center" bgcolor="#bbffbb"
| 12 || November 13|| Detroit Pistons || 122–93 || Boston Garden || 8–4
|- align="center" bgcolor="#bbffbb"
| 13 || November 16|| @ San Francisco Warriors || 108–105 || San Francisco || 9–4
|- align="center" bgcolor="edbebf"
| 14 || November 17|| @ Los Angeles Lakers || 115–125 || Los Angeles || 9–5
|- align="center" bgcolor="#bbffbb"
| 15 || November 19|| Cincinnati Royals || 129–103 || Boston Garden || 10–5
|- align="center" bgcolor="#bbffbb"
| 16 || November 20|| @ New York Knicks || 122–108 || Madison Square Garden || 11–5
|- align="center" bgcolor="#bbffbb"
| 17 || November 24|| New York Knicks || 125–110 || Boston Garden || 12–5
|- align="center" bgcolor="#bbffbb"
| 18 || November 26|| Detroit Pistons || 134–114 || Providence || 13–5
|- align="center" bgcolor="#bbffbb"
| 19 || November 27|| Los Angeles Lakers || 101–95 || Boston Garden || 14–5
|-

|- align="center" bgcolor="edbebf"
| 20 || December 3|| Philadelphia 76ers || 103–119 || Boston Garden || 14–6
|- align="center" bgcolor="#bbffbb"
| 21 || December 4|| @ St. Louis Hawks || 100–94 || St. Louis Arena  || 15–6
|- align="center" bgcolor="edbebf"
| 22 || December 5|| @ Cincinnati Royals || 99–108 || Cincinnati || 15–7
|- align="center" bgcolor="#bbffbb" 	
| 23 || December 7|| St. Louis Hawks || 112–96 || New York, NY || 16–7
|- align="center" bgcolor="#bbffbb"
| 24 || December 8|| Los Angeles Lakers || 108–106 || Boston Garden || 17–7
|- align="center" bgcolor="#bbffbb"
| 25 || December 11|| San Francisco Warriors || 143–106 || Boston Garden || 18–7
|- align="center" bgcolor="edbebf"
| 26 || December 15|| Cincinnati Royals || 110–117 || Boston Garden|| 18–8
|- align="center" bgcolor="#bbffbb"
| 27 || December 17|| @ Detroit Pistons || 114–112 || Detroit || 19–8
|- align="center" bgcolor="#bbffbb"
| 28 || December 22|| New York Knickerbockers || 123–120 || Boston Garden || 20–8
|- align="center" bgcolor="#bbffbb"
| 29 || December 25|| @ Baltimore Bullets || 113–99 || Baltimore || 21–8
|- align="center" bgcolor="#bbffbb"
| 30 || December 26|| Baltimore Bullets || 120–99 || Baltimore || 22–8
|- align="center" bgcolor="edbebf"
| 31 || December 28|| @ Philadelphia 76ers || 93–102 || Baltimore || 22–9
|- align="center" bgcolor="#bbffbb"
| 32 || December 29|| @ New York Knicks || 99–96 || Madison Square Garden || 23–9
|- align="center" bgcolor="#bbffbb"
| 33 || December 30|| San Francisco Warriors || 116–113 || Providence || 24–9
|-

|- align="center" bgcolor="edbebf"
| 34 || January 1|| @ St. Louis Hawks || 98–100 || St. Louis Arena  || 24–10
|- align="center" bgcolor="#bbffbb"
| 35 || January 2|| @ Los Angeles Lakers || 124–113 || Los Angeles Memorial Sports Arena  || 25–10
|- align="center" bgcolor="edbebf"
| 36 || January 5|| @ Los Angeles Lakers || 113–120 || Los Angeles Memorial Sports Arena  || 25–11
|- align="center" bgcolor="#bbffbb"
| 37 || January 7|| @ San Francisco Warriors || 115–114 || San Francisco Civic Auditorium || 26–11
|- align="center" bgcolor="#bbffbb"
| 38 || January 8|| @ San Francisco Warriors || 124–96 || San Francisco Civic Auditorium || 27–11
|- align="center" bgcolor="#bbffbb"
| 39 || January 12|| Los Angeles Lakers || 114–102 || Boston Garden || 28–11
|- align="center" bgcolor="edbebf"
| 40 || January 14|| @ Philadelphia 76ers || 100–112 || Convention Hall  || 28–12
|- align="center" bgcolor="#bbffbb"
| 41 || January 16|| Philadelphia 76ers || 137–122 || Boston Garden  || 29–12
|- align="center" bgcolor="edbebf"
| 42 || January 18|| Detroit Pistons || 115–116 || Philadelphia || 29–13
|- align="center" bgcolor="#bbffbb"
| 43 || January 19|| Baltimore Bullets || 129–89 || Boston Garden  || 30–13
|- align="center" bgcolor="#bbffbb"
| 44 || January 21|| Cincinnati Royals || 113–96 || Boston Garden  || 31–13
|- align="center" bgcolor="edbebf"
| 45 || January 22|| @ Baltimore Bullets || 107–132 || Baltimore Civic Center  || 31–14
|- align="center" bgcolor="edbebf"
| 46 || January 25|| @ Cincinnati Royals || 101–113 || Cincinnati Gardens  || 31–15
|- align="center" bgcolor="#bbffbb"
| 47 || January 27|| Detroit Pistons || 131–112 || Fort Wayne, IN  || 32–15
|- align="center" bgcolor="edbebf"
| 48 || January 28|| Detroit Pistons || 105–108 || Boston Garden  || 32–16
|- align="center" bgcolor="#bbffbb"
| 49 || January 29|| @ New York Knickerbockers || 119–107 || Madison Square Garden  || 33–16
|- align="center" bgcolor="#bbffbb"
| 50 || January 30|| New York Knickerbockers || 118–115 || Boston Garden  || 34–16
|-

|- align="center" bgcolor="#bbffbb"
| 51 || February 1|| Detroit Pistons || 100–81 || New York  || 35–16
|- align="center" bgcolor="edbebf"
| 52 || February 2|| @ Detroit Pistons || 93–99 || Cobo Arena  || 35–17
|- align="center" bgcolor="#bbffbb"
| 53 || February 4|| St. Louis Hawks || 117–95 || Boston Garden  || 36–17
|- align="center" bgcolor="edbebf"
| 54 || February 5|| @ Baltimore Bullets || 94–113 || Baltimore Civic Center  || 36–18
|- align="center" bgcolor="#bbffbb"
| 55 || February 6|| Philadelphia 76ers || 100–99 || Boston Garden  || 37–18
|- align="center" bgcolor="#bbffbb"
| 56 || February 7|| San Francisco Warriors || 112–107 || Philadelphia  || 38–18
|- align="center" bgcolor="#bbffbb"
| 57 || February 9|| New York Knicks || 121–117 || Boston Garden  || 39–18
|- align="center" bgcolor="edbebf"
| 58 || February 10|| San Francisco Warriors || 117–128 || Providence, RI  || 39–19
|- align="center" bgcolor="#bbffbb"
| 59 || February 11|| San Francisco Warriors || 99–96 || Boston Garden  || 40–19
|- align="center" bgcolor="#bbffbb"
| 60 || February 12|| Philadelphia 76ers || 85–83 || Syracuse, NY  || 41–19
|- align="center" bgcolor="edbebf"
| 61 || February 13|| Los Angeles Lakers || 110–120 || Boston Garden  || 41–20
|- align="center" bgcolor="edbebf"
| 62 || February 15|| @ Cincinnati Royals || 123–136 || Cincinnati Gardens  || 41–21
|- align="center" bgcolor="edbebf"
| 63 || February 18|| @ San Francisco Warriors || 106–128 || San Francisco Civic Auditorium|| 41–22
|- align="center" bgcolor="#bbffbb"
| 64 || February 19|| @ Los Angeles Lakers || 115–111 || Los Angeles Memorial Sports Arena|| 42–22
|- align="center" bgcolor="#bbffbb"
| 65 || February 21|| @ Los Angeles Lakers || 115–108 || Los Angeles Memorial Sports Arena|| 43–22
|- align="center" bgcolor="#bbffbb"
| 66 || February 22|| @ San Francisco Warriors || 116–108 || San Francisco Civic Auditorium|| 44–22
|- align="center" bgcolor="#bbffbb"
| 67 || February 24|| St. Louis Hawks || 134–106 || Boston Garden|| 45–22
|- align="center" bgcolor="#bbffbb"
| 68 || February 26|| @ New York Knicks || 100–95 || Madison Square Garden|| 46–22
|- align="center" bgcolor="edbebf"
| 69 || February 27|| @ Baltimore Bullets || 92–132 || Baltimore Civic Center || 46–23
|-

|- align="center" bgcolor="#bbffbb"
| 70 || March 1|| @ St. Louis Hawks || 120–95 || Kiel Auditorium|| 47–23
|- align="center" bgcolor="#bbffbb"
| 71 || March 2|| New York Knickerbockers || 140–104 || Boston Garden|| 48–23
|- align="center" bgcolor="edbebf"
| 72 || March 4|| St. Louis Hawks || 112–132 || Providence, RI|| 48–24
|- align="center" bgcolor="edbebf"
| 73 || March 5|| @ Philadelphia 76ers || 85–102 || Convention Hall|| 48–25
|- align="center" bgcolor="edbebf"
| 74 || March 6|| Philadelphia 76ers || 110–113 || Boston Garden|| 48–26
|- align="center" bgcolor="#bbffbb"
| 75 || March 7|| St. Louis Hawks || 106–104 || Memphis, TN|| 49–26
|- align="center" bgcolor="#bbffbb"
| 76 || March 10|| @ Cincinnati Royals || 124–120 || Cincinnati Gardens  || 50–26
|- align="center" bgcolor="#bbffbb"
| 77 || March 13|| Baltimore Bullets || 129–98 || Boston Garden || 51–26
|- align="center" bgcolor="#bbffbb"
| 78 || March 17|| @ Detroit Pistons || 128–103 || Cobo Arena || 52–26
|- align="center" bgcolor="#bbffbb"
| 79 || March 19|| @ New York Knicks || 126–113 || Madison Square Garden || 53–26
|- align="center" bgcolor="#bbffbb"
| 80 || March 20|| Cincinnati Royals || 121–104 || Boston Garden || 54–26
|-

|-
| 1965–66 Schedule

Playoffs

|- align="center" bgcolor="#ffcccc"
| 1
| March 23
| Cincinnati
| L 103–107
| Bill Russell (22)
| Bill Russell (29)
| Russell, Havlicek (4)
| Boston Garden9,510
| 0–1
|- align="center" bgcolor="#ccffcc"
| 2
| March 26
| @ Cincinnati
| W 132–125
| Sam Jones (42)
| Bill Russell (16)
| K. C. Jones (9)
| Cincinnati Gardens10,027
| 1–1
|- align="center" bgcolor="#ffcccc"
| 3
| March 27
| Cincinnati
| L 107–113
| John Havlicek (36)
| Bill Russell (25)
| K. C. Jones (6)
| Boston Garden13,571
| 1–2
|- align="center" bgcolor="#ccffcc"
| 4
| March 30
| @ Cincinnati
| W 120–103
| Sam Jones (32)
| Bill Russell (26)
| John Havlicek (8)
| Cincinnati Gardens12,107
| 2–2
|- align="center" bgcolor="#ccffcc"
| 5
| April 1
| Cincinnati
| W 112–103
| Sam Jones (34)
| Bill Russell (31)
| Bill Russell (11)
| Boston Garden13,909
| 3–2
|-

|- align="center" bgcolor="#ccffcc"
| 1
| April 3
| @ Philadelphia
| W 115–96
| Sam Jones (29)
| Bill Russell (18)
| three players tied (4)
| Municipal Auditorium6,563
| 1–0
|- align="center" bgcolor="#ccffcc"
| 2
| April 6
| Philadelphia
| W 114–93
| Sam Jones (23)
| Bill Russell (29)
| K. C. Jones (11)
| Boston Garden13,909
| 2–0
|- align="center" bgcolor="#ffcccc"
| 3
| April 7
| @ Philadelphia
| L 105–111
| John Havlicek (27)
| Bill Russell (23)
| Sam Jones (6)
| Municipal Auditorium10,454
| 2–1
|- align="center" bgcolor="#ccffcc"
| 4
| April 10
| Philadelphia
| W 114–108 (OT)
| John Havlicek (27)
| Bill Russell (30)
| Russell, Havlicek (7)
| Boston Garden13,909
| 3–1
|- align="center" bgcolor="#ccffcc"
| 5
| April 12
| @ Philadelphia
| W 120–112
| John Havlicek (32)
| Bill Russell (31)
| Bill Russell (6)
| Municipal Auditorium8,623
| 4–1
|-

|- align="center" bgcolor="#ffcccc"
| 1
| April 17
| Los Angeles
| L 129–133 (OT)
| Bill Russell (28)
| Bill Russell (26)
| Sam Jones (9)
| Boston Garden13,909
| 0–1
|- align="center" bgcolor="#ccffcc"
| 2
| April 19
| Los Angeles
| W 129–109
| Havlicek, S. Jones (21)
| Bill Russell (24)
| John Havlicek (7)
| Boston Garden13,909
| 1–1
|- align="center" bgcolor="#ccffcc"
| 3
| April 20
| @ Los Angeles
| W 120–106
| Sam Jones (36)
| Bill Russell (19)
| Sanders, K. C. Jones (5)
| Los Angeles Memorial Sports Arena15,101
| 2–1
|- align="center" bgcolor="#ccffcc"
| 4
| April 22
| @ Los Angeles
| W 122–117
| John Havlicek (32)
| Bill Russell (18)
| Larry Siegfried (7)
| Los Angeles Memorial Sports Arena15,251
| 3–1
|- align="center" bgcolor="#ffcccc"
| 5
| April 24
| Los Angeles
| L 117–121
| Bill Russell (32)
| Bill Russell (28)
| Siegfried, K. C. Jones (6)
| Boston Garden13,909
| 3–2
|- align="center" bgcolor="#ffcccc"
| 6
| April 26
| @ Los Angeles
| L 115–123
| John Havlicek (27)
| Bill Russell (23)
| K. C. Jones (6)
| Los Angeles Memorial Sports Arena15,069
| 3–3
|- align="center" bgcolor="#ccffcc"
| 7
| April 28
| Los Angeles
| W 95–93
| Bill Russell (25)
| Bill Russell (32)
| Sanders, K. C. Jones (3)
| Boston Garden13,909
| 4–3
|-

Awards, records and milestones

Awards
John Havlicek, All-NBA Second Team
Sam Jones, All-NBA Second Team
Bill Russell, All-NBA Second Team

References

 Celtics on Database Basketball
 Celtics on Basketball Reference

Boston Celtics seasons
NBA championship seasons
Boston Celtics
Boston Celtics
Boston Celtics
1960s in Boston